Green Arena is an arena in Hamamatsu, Shizuoka, Japan.

References

Basketball venues in Japan
Indoor arenas in Japan
San-en NeoPhoenix
Sports venues in Shizuoka Prefecture
Sports venues completed in 2002
2002 establishments in Japan
Buildings and structures in Hamamatsu